Acacia sarcophylla is a species of legume in the family Fabaceae.
It is a perennial shrub found in Somalia and Yemen.
It is threatened by habitat loss, and is on the World Conservation Union Red List.

Sources

References 

sarcophylla
Flora of Somalia
Flora of Yemen
Near threatened plants
Taxonomy articles created by Polbot
Taxobox binomials not recognized by IUCN